The 1973–74 Toronto Maple Leafs season was the 57th season of the Toronto NHL franchise, 47th as the Maple Leafs. The Leafs placed fourth to make the playoffs, but were swept in the first round by the Boston Bruins.

Offseason
The Maple Leafs made several signings that would improve their team. At the entry draft, the Maple Leafs chose Lanny McDonald with the fourth-overall draft pick. He would play six and a half seasons with the Maple Leafs. Bernie Parent, who had left the team for the World Hockey Association (WHA) in 1972, made it known that he wanted to return to the NHL. The Maple Leafs still had his NHL rights, and they traded Parent to the Philadelphia Flyers for Doug Favell and a first-round draft pick, which the Maple Leafs used to choose Bob Neely. Neely would play four seasons for the Maple Leafs before being traded to the Colorado Rockies.

In a first for Toronto, the club signed players from Europe. Toronto signed Swedish defenceman Borje Salming and forward Inge Hammarstrom. Salming had made the all-star team at the 1973 world championships. Hammarstrom was one of the top scorers in Sweden. Both had played for Brynas of the Swedish League, and the Leafs had to pay the Swedish Ice Hockey Federation for their release. Salming would play with the Leafs until 1989, when he joined the Detroit Red Wings. Hammarstrom would play five seasons in Toronto before moving to the St. Louis Blues.

Regular season

Final standings

Schedule and results

Playoffs

Player statistics

Regular season
Scoring

Goaltending

Playoffs
Scoring

Goaltending

Awards and records

Transactions
The Maple Leafs have been involved in the following transactions during the 1973–74 season.

Trades

Free agents

Draft picks
Toronto's draft picks at the 1973 NHL Amateur Draft held at the Queen Elizabeth Hotel in Montreal, Quebec.

Farm teams

See also
 1973–74 NHL season

References

External links

Toronto Maple Leafs season, 1973-74
Toronto M
Toronto Maple Leafs seasons